The Cavite Provincial Board is the Sangguniang Panlalawigan (provincial legislature) of the Philippine province of Cavite.

The members are elected via plurality-at-large voting: the province is divided into eight districts, two representatives in each district. The candidates with the highest number of votes in each district, depending on the number of members the district sends, are elected. The vice governor is the ex officio presiding officer, and only votes to break ties. The vice governor is elected via the plurality voting system province-wide.

The districts used in appropriation of members is coextensive with the legislative districts of Cavite.

Aside from the regular members, the board also includes the provincial federation presidents of the Liga ng mga Barangay (ABC, from its old name "Association of Barangay Captains"), the Sangguniang Kabataan (SK, youth councils) and the Philippine Councilors League (PCL).

District apportionment

List of members 
An additional three ex officio members are the presidents of the provincial chapters of the Association of Barangay Captains, the Councilors' League, the Sangguniang Kabataan
provincial president; the municipal and city (if applicable) presidents of the Association of Barangay Captains, Councilor's League and Sangguniang Kabataan, shall elect amongst themselves their provincial presidents which shall be their representatives at the board.

Vice Governor

1st District 

 City: Cavite City
 Municipalities: Kawit, Noveleta, Rosario
 Population (2020): 368,468

2nd District 

 City: Bacoor
 Population (2020): 664,625

3rd District 

 City: Imus
 Population (2020): 496,794

4th District 

 City: Dasmariñas
 Population (2020): 703,141

5th District 

 Municipalities: Carmona, General Mariano Alvarez, Silang
 Population (2020): 574,333

6th District

2019–present
 City: General Trias
 Population (2020):  450,583

2013–2019
 City: Trece Martires
 Municipalities: Amadeo, General Trias (became city 2015), Indang, Tanza

7th District

2019–present
 City: Trece Martires
 Municipalities: Amadeo, Indang, Tanza
 Population (2020): 633,219

2013–2019
City: Tagaytay
Municipalities: Alfonso, General Emilio Aguinaldo, Indang, Magallanes, Maragondon, Mendez, Naic, Ternate

8th District 

 City: Tagaytay
 Municipalities: Alfonso, General Emilio Aguinaldo,  Magallanes, Maragondon, Mendez, Naic, Ternate
 Population (2020): 453,666

Philippine Councilor's League President

Liga ng mga Barangay President

SK Provincial Federation President

References

Provincial boards in the Philippines